A crossbuck is a traffic sign used to indicate a level railway crossing.  It is composed of two slats of wood or metal of equal length, fastened together on a pole in a saltire formation (resembling the letter X). Crossbucks are sometimes supplemented by electrical warnings of flashing lights, a bell, or a boom barrier that descends to block the road and prevent traffic from crossing the tracks.

Vienna Convention
The Vienna Convention on Road Signs and Signals, a multilateral treaty of the United Nations with the intention of standardizing traffic signs around the world, prescribes several different regulations for the "crossbuck" sign.

The first model may have a white or yellow ground with a thick red or black border. The second model may have a white or yellow ground with a thin black border and an inscription, such as "RAILWAY CROSSING". If lateral clearance obstructs the placement of the sign, it may be rotated 90° so that its points are directed vertically. If used at a level crossing with more than 1 set of tracks, a half cross or a supplementary plate stating the number of tracks may be added below.

Most countries use one of these models:

Variants around the world

In the United States, the crossbuck carries the words "RAIL" and "ROAD" on one arm and "CROSSING" on the other ("RAIL" and "ROAD" are separated by the "CROSSING" arm), in black text on a white background. Older variants simply used black and white paint; newer installations use a reflective white material with non-reflective lettering. Some antique U.S. crossbucks were painted in other color schemes, and used glass "cat's eye" reflectors on the letters to make them stand out. Other countries, such as China, also use this layout, but with appropriately localized terms. Often, a supplemental sign below the crossbuck indicates the number of tracks at the crossing.

A special kind of crossing sign assembly was introduced on an experimental basis in Ohio in 1992, the "Buckeye Crossbuck". It included an enhanced crossbuck, reflective and with red lettering, and also a reflective plate reading "YIELD" below the crossbuck, whose sides are bent backwards in order to catch and reflect at a right angle the light of an approaching train. The experiment's final report gave the device a favorable review; however, the plate, R15-9 "Crossbuck Shield", was rejected for inclusion in the 2003 Manual on Uniform Traffic Control Devices.

In Canada, crossbucks have a red border and no lettering.  These were installed in the 1980s shortly after English-French bilingualism was made official, replacing signs of a style similar to those used in the U.S., except the word "RAILWAY" was used instead of "RAILROAD" and in certain areas the words "TRAVERSE DE CHEMIN DE FER" were used.

In Mexico, the crossbucks read "CRUCERO FERROCARRIL", a literal translation of its U.S. counterpart. Older designs read "CUIDADO CON EL TREN", meaning "beware of the train".

In Argentina, the most common legend is "PELIGRO FERROCARRIL" ("danger: railroad"). Other crosses also read "CUIDADO CON LOS TRENES - PARE MIRE ESCUCHE ("beware of the trains - stop, look, listen") for the Ferrocarril Belgrano, "PASO A NIVEL - FERRO CARRIL" for the Ferrocarril Mitre and "CUIDADO CON LOS TRENES" ("beware of the trains") for the Ferrocarril Roca.

In parts of Europe, the cross is white with red trimmings or ends, sometimes on a rectangular background; in Finland and Greece the cross is yellow, trimmed with red.

Taiwan uses two crossbucks: a version with a yellow and black cross, and one with the cross in white with a red border. A special symbol in the center indicates an electric railroad crossing, cautioning road users about excessive height cargo that may contact the electric wires.

In Australia, the crossbuck is a St Andrews Cross as in Europe, but uses words and the same color as the American crossbuck. In contrast to the American "RAILROAD CROSSING", Australian signs say "RAILWAY CROSSING" or "TRAMWAY CROSSING". (Most cases where a tram in its own right-of-way crosses a road do not use a crossbuck and so are regular intersections rather than level crossings.)

Different countries may classify the sign differently. For example, in Australia it is considered a regulatory sign, while in close neighbour New Zealand it is considered a warning sign. Some countries, such as Australia, France, New Zealand, Slovakia and Slovenia may place the crossbuck design on a "target board", while other countries quite often do not. In the United Kingdom, it is only used for crossings with no barriers or signal lights.

Crossbucks of the world

Multiple tracks
Several countries use a sign to indicate that multiple tracks must be crossed at a level crossing. In Australia, Canada, New Zealand, and the U.S., a sign is mounted beneath the crossbuck (above the warning light assembly, if any) with the number of tracks. Many European countries use multiple crossbucks or additional chevrons ("half-crossbucks") below the first one. Taiwan also uses half-crossbucks below the regular crossbuck.

Advance warning
Several countries include the crossbuck iconography in their warning signs for a railway crossing ahead.

See also 
 Saltire

References

External links

Part 8. Traffic Control for Railroad and Light Rail Transit Grade Crossings, U.S. Manual on Uniform Traffic Control Devices, 2009 ed.

Level crossings
Railway safety
Traffic signs